The Paris Convention for the Protection of Industrial Property, signed in Paris, France, on 20 March 1883, was one of the first intellectual property treaties. It established a Union for the protection of industrial property. The convention is currently still in force. The substantive provisions of the Convention fall into three main categories: national treatment, priority right and common rules.

Contents

National treatment 
According to Articles 2 and 3 of this treaty, juristic and natural persons who are either national of or domiciled in a state party to the Convention shall, as regards the protection of industrial property, enjoy in all the other countries of the Union, the advantages that their respective laws grant to nationals.

In other words, when an applicant files an application for a patent or a trademark in a foreign country member of the Union, the application receives the same treatment as if it came from a national of this foreign country. Furthermore, if the intellectual property right is granted (e.g. if the applicant becomes owners of a patent or of a registered trademark), the owner benefits from the same protections and the same legal remedy against any infringement as if the owner was a national owner of this right.

Priority right 
The "Convention priority right", also called "Paris Convention priority right" or "Union priority right", was also established by Article 4 of the Paris Convention, and is regarded as one of the cornerstones of the Paris Convention. It provides that an applicant from one contracting State shall be able to use its first filing date (in one of the contracting States) as the effective filing date in another contracting State, provided that the applicant, or the applicant's successor in title, files a subsequent application within 6 months (for industrial designs and trademarks) or 12 months (for patents and utility models) from the first filing.

Temporary protection for goods shown at some international exhibitions
Article 11(1) of the Paris Convention requires that the Countries of the Union "grant temporary protection to patentable inventions, utility models, industrial designs, and trademarks, in respect of goods exhibited at official or officially recognized international exhibitions held in the territory of any of them".

If a patent or trademark registration is applied for during the temporary period of protection, the priority date of the application may be counted "from the date of introduction of the goods into the exhibition" rather than from the date of filing of the application, if the temporary protection referred to in Article 11(1) has been implemented in such a manner in national law. There are, however, other means for the Countries of the Union to implement in their national law the temporary protection provided for in Article 11 of the Paris Convention:

Mutual independence of patents and trademarks in the different Countries of the Union
According to Articles 4bis and 6 (for patents and trademarks respectively), for foreigners, the application for a patent or the registration of a trademark shall be determined by the member state in accordance with their national law and not by the decision of the country of origin or any other countries. Patent applications and trademark registrations are independent among contracting countries.

History 
After a diplomatic conference in Paris in 1880, the convention was signed on 20 March 1883 by 11 countries: Belgium, Brazil, France, Guatemala, Italy, the Netherlands, Portugal, El Salvador, Kingdom of Serbia, Spain and Switzerland. Guatemala, El Salvador and Serbia denounced and reapplied the convention via accession.

The Treaty was revised at Brussels, Belgium, on 14 December 1900, at Washington, United States, on 2 June 1911, at The Hague, Netherlands, on 6 November 1925, at London, on 2 June 1934, at Lisbon, Portugal, on 31 October 1958, and at Stockholm, Sweden, on 14 July 1967. It was amended on 28 September 1979.

Contracting parties 

As of 21 April 2022, the convention has 179 contracting member countries, which makes it one of the most widely adopted treaties worldwide.

Administration 
The Paris Convention is administered by the World Intellectual Property Organization (WIPO), based in Geneva, Switzerland.

See also 
 Agreement on Trade-Related Aspects of Intellectual Property Rights (TRIPs)
 Berne Convention for the Protection of Literary and Artistic Works
 Budapest Treaty
 Convention Establishing the World Intellectual Property Organization (WIPO Convention)
 Patent Cooperation Treaty (PCT)
 Patent Law Treaty (PLT)
 US provisional patent application
 Substantive Patent Law Treaty (SPLT)
 World Intellectual Property Organization (WIPO)

References

Further reading 
 
 Schuyler, William E. "Paris Convention for the Protection of Industrial Property-A View of the Proposed Revisions." NCJ Int'l L. & Com. Reg. 8 (1982): 155+. online

External links 
Paris Convention at the World Intellectual Property Organization (WIPO)
Haberman v Comptroller, a UK court decision that helps to understand the concept of priority.

Intellectual property treaties
Patent law treaties
Trademark legislation
World Intellectual Property Organization treaties
1883 in France
1883 treaties
Industrial design
Treaties entered into force in 1884
Treaties of Albania
Treaties of Algeria
Treaties of Andorra
Treaties of Antigua and Barbuda
Treaties of Angola
Treaties of Argentina
Treaties of Armenia
Treaties of Australia
Treaties of Austria-Hungary
Treaties of Azerbaijan
Treaties of the Bahamas
Treaties of Bahrain
Treaties of Bangladesh
Treaties of Barbados
Treaties of Belarus
Treaties of Belgium
Treaties of Belize
Treaties of the Republic of Dahomey
Treaties of Bhutan
Treaties of Bolivia
Treaties of Bosnia and Herzegovina
Treaties of Botswana
Treaties of the Empire of Brazil
Treaties of the Kingdom of Bulgaria
Treaties of Brunei
Treaties of Burkina Faso
Treaties of Burundi
Treaties of Cambodia
Treaties of Cameroon
Treaties of Canada
Treaties of the Central African Republic
Treaties of Chad
Treaties of Chile
Treaties of the People's Republic of China
Treaties of Colombia
Treaties of the Comoros
Treaties of Zaire
Treaties of the Republic of the Congo
Treaties of Costa Rica
Treaties of Ivory Coast
Treaties of Croatia
Treaties of Cuba
Treaties of Cyprus
Treaties of Czechoslovakia
Treaties of the Czech Republic
Treaties of Denmark
Treaties of Djibouti
Treaties of Dominica
Treaties of the Dominican Republic
Treaties of Ecuador
Treaties of the Kingdom of Egypt
Treaties of El Salvador
Treaties of Equatorial Guinea
Treaties of Estonia
Treaties of Finland
Treaties of the French Third Republic
Treaties of Gabon
Treaties of the Gambia
Treaties of Georgia (country)
Treaties of the German Empire
Treaties of Ghana
Treaties of the Kingdom of Greece
Treaties of Grenada
Treaties of Guatemala
Treaties of Guinea
Treaties of Guinea-Bissau
Treaties of Haiti
Treaties of Honduras
Treaties extended to British Hong Kong
Treaties of Iceland
Treaties of India
Treaties of Indonesia
Treaties of Pahlavi Iran
Treaties of Ba'athist Iraq
Treaties of the Irish Free State
Treaties of Israel
Treaties of the Kingdom of Italy (1861–1946)
Treaties of Jamaica
Treaties of the Empire of Japan
Treaties of Jordan
Treaties of Kazakhstan
Treaties of Kenya
Treaties of Kiribati
Treaties of North Korea
Treaties of South Korea
Treaties of Kuwait
Treaties of Kyrgyzstan
Treaties of Laos
Treaties of Latvia
Treaties of Lebanon
Treaties of Lesotho
Treaties of Liberia
Treaties of the Libyan Arab Republic
Treaties of Liechtenstein
Treaties of Lithuania
Treaties of Luxembourg
Treaties extended to Macau
Treaties of North Macedonia
Treaties of Madagascar
Treaties of Malawi
Treaties of Malaysia
Treaties of Mali
Treaties of Malta
Treaties of Mauritania
Treaties of Mauritius
Treaties of Mexico
Treaties of Moldova
Treaties of Monaco
Treaties of Montenegro
Treaties of Morocco
Treaties of Mozambique
Treaties of Namibia
Treaties of Nepal
Treaties of the Netherlands
Treaties of New Zealand
Treaties of Niger
Treaties of Nigeria
Treaties of Norway
Treaties of Oman
Treaties of Pakistan
Treaties of Panama
Treaties of Papua New Guinea
Treaties of Paraguay
Treaties of Peru
Treaties of the Philippines
Treaties of the Second Polish Republic
Treaties of the Kingdom of Portugal
Treaties of Qatar
Treaties of the Kingdom of Romania
Treaties of the Soviet Union
Treaties of Rwanda
Treaties of Saint Kitts and Nevis
Treaties of Saint Lucia
Treaties of Saint Vincent and the Grenadines
Treaties of San Marino
Treaties of São Tomé and Príncipe
Treaties of Saudi Arabia
Treaties of Senegal
Treaties of Serbia and Montenegro
Treaties of Seychelles
Treaties of Sierra Leone
Treaties of Singapore
Treaties of Slovakia
Treaties of Slovenia
Treaties of the Union of South Africa
Treaties of the Spanish Empire
Treaties of the Dominion of Ceylon
Treaties of the Democratic Republic of the Sudan
Treaties of Suriname
Treaties of Eswatini
Treaties of Sweden
Treaties of Switzerland
Treaties of Syria
Treaties of Tajikistan
Treaties of Tanzania
Treaties of Thailand
Treaties of Togo
Treaties of Tonga
Treaties of Trinidad and Tobago
Treaties of Tunisia
Treaties of Turkey
Treaties of Turkmenistan
Treaties of Uganda
Treaties of Ukraine
Treaties of the United Arab Emirates
Treaties of the United Kingdom (1801–1922)
Treaties of the United States
Treaties of Uruguay
Treaties of Uzbekistan
Treaties of the Holy See
Treaties of Venezuela
Treaties of North Vietnam
Treaties of Zambia
Treaties of Zimbabwe
Treaties of Yugoslavia
Treaties of the Orange Free State
Treaties of the Colony of Queensland
Treaties extended to the Netherlands Antilles
Treaties extended to Aruba
Treaties extended to Curaçao and Dependencies
Treaties extended to the Dutch East Indies
Treaties extended to Surinam (Dutch colony)
Treaties extended to the Isle of Man
Treaties extended to American Samoa
Treaties extended to Baker Island
Treaties extended to Guam
Treaties extended to Howland Island
Treaties extended to Jarvis Island
Treaties extended to Johnston Atoll
Treaties extended to Midway Atoll
Treaties extended to Navassa Island
Treaties extended to the Trust Territory of the Pacific Islands
Treaties extended to Palmyra Atoll
Treaties extended to Puerto Rico
Treaties extended to the United States Virgin Islands
Treaties extended to Wake Island
Treaties extended to Tanganyika (territory)
Treaties extended to the Crown Colony of Singapore
Treaties extended to Mandatory Palestine
Treaties extended to the Crown Colony of Trinidad and Tobago
Treaties extended to British Ceylon
Treaties extended to the Panama Canal Zone
Treaties extended to Portuguese Macau
Treaties extended to Australia
Treaties extended to New Zealand
Treaties extended to South Sakhalin
Treaties extended to Korea (Japanese possession)
Treaties extended to Formosa
Treaties of Afghanistan